In mathematics, and in particular differential geometry and complex geometry, a complex analytic variety   or complex analytic space is a generalization of a complex manifold which allows the presence of singularities. Complex analytic varieties are locally ringed spaces which are locally isomorphic to local model spaces, where a local model space is an open subset of the vanishing locus of a finite set of holomorphic functions.

Definition

Let  be the common vanishing locus of these holomorphic functions, that is, . Then the locally ringed -space  is a local model space. 

A complex analytic variety is a locally ringed -space  which is locally isomorphic to a local model space.

Morphisms of complex analytic varieties are defined to be morphisms of the underlying locally ringed spaces, they are also called holomorphic maps. A structure sheaf may have nilpotent element,
and also, when the complex analytic space whose structure sheaf is reduced, then the complex analytic space is reduced, that is, the complex analytic space may not be reduced.

An associated complex analytic space (variety)  is such that;

Therefore, their common zero of the set is the complex analytic subspace . Here, scheme X obtained by glueing the data of the set , and then the same data can be used to glueing the complex analytic space  into an complex analytic space , so we call  a associated complex analytic space with X. The complex analytic space X is reduced if and only if the associated complex analytic space  reduced.

See also
Algebraic variety - Roughly speaking, an (complex) analytic variety is a zero locus of a set of an (complex) analytic function, while an algebraic variety is a zero locus of a set of a polynomial function and allowing singular point.
Analytic space
Complex algebraic variety
GAGA
Rigid analytic space

Note

Annotation

References

 (no.10-13)

External links 

 Kiran Kedlaya. 18.726 Algebraic Geometry (LEC # 30 - 33 GAGA)Spring 2009. Massachusetts Institute of Technology: MIT OpenCourseWare Creative Commons BY-NC-SA.
 Tasty Bits of Several Complex Variables(p.137) open source book by Jiří Lebl BY-NC-SA.

Algebraic geometry
Several complex variables